The Dja River scrub warbler (Bradypterus grandis) is a species of Old World warbler in the family Locustellidae.
It is found in Cameroon, Central African Republic, and Gabon.
Its natural habitat is swamps.
It is threatened by habitat loss.

References

Dja River scrub warbler
Birds of Central Africa
Dja River scrub warbler
Taxonomy articles created by Polbot